Taking the Hill is a news and commentary series broadcast on MSNBC in the United States. Hosted by Iraq War veteran and former Congress member Patrick J. Murphy, the series focused on "leadership, public service and breaking down the civil-military divide in the country". It began on November 6, 2013 as a one-hour discussion accompanying the documentary Wounded: The Battle Back Home. The show became a regular series in December 2013. Taking the Hill was broadcast on the fourth Sunday monthly.

In its multi-year run, the show generated many awards to include the CLIO Award in conjunction with the Wounded Warrior Project and Imagine Dragons, for their running series, Wounded: The Battle Back Home.  Murphy also received the Sherwood Award for his role as host and executive producer of Taking the Hill.

Taking the Hill was cancelled when Murphy was nominated to serve as the Under Secretary of the Army by the Obama Administration.

Taking the Hill Productions 
The production company, Taking the Hill LLC a/k/a PJM Productions, continues to create and consult on major television and film projects. This award-winning scripted & unscripted production company gives voice to those with gritty, authentic and powerful stories. The company focuses on telling the stories of American warriors, the less than 1% who’ve answered the call, and others who have served for the greater good. It works with creators (actors, writers & directors) and brands early in the creative process to ensure their vision comes to life in film and television.

References

MSNBC original programming